Libraries often band together in consortia for cooperative resource purchasing and sharing.  The International Coalition of Library Consortia, or ICOLC, is an informal group of about 150 such consortia from around the world.

 The Alberta Library
 AMICAL Consortium
 Amigos Library Services
 Bibliographic Association of the Red River
 Bibliographical Center for Research
 Boston Library Consortium
 Califa, a library consortium representing 200+ libraries in California
 Catamount Library Network
 Center for Research Libraries
 Chemeketa Cooperative Regional Library Service
 CLEVNET
 Colorado Alliance of Research Libraries
 Colorado Library Consortium
 ConnectNY
 CONSORT Colleges
 Consortium of Academic and Research Libraries in Illinois
 Consortium of Universities of the Washington Metropolitan Area
 Detroit Area Library Network
 Digital Library Federation
 Digital Scriptorium
 Flanders Heritage Library
 Gauteng and Environs Library Consortium
 HBCU Library Alliance
 International Coalition of Library Consortia
 International Internet Preservation Consortium
 Jefferson County Library Cooperative
 Keystone Library Network
 Library and Information Resources Network
 Library Information Network of Clackamas County
 LOUIS: The Louisiana Library Network
 Lyrasis
 M25 Consortium of Academic Libraries
 Massachusetts Library Association
 MCIT Library Consortium
 Membership Libraries Group
 Metropolitan Library Service Agency
 Metropolitan New York Library Council
 Michigan eLibrary
 Michigan Library Consortium
 Midwest Transportation Knowledge Network
 Minitex
 Minuteman Library Network
 Missouri Library Network Corporation
 MOBIUS
 Municipal Library Consortium of St. Louis County
 National and State Libraries Australia
 National Research Libraries Alliance
 NC Live
 NEFLIN
 NELINET
 NEOS Library Consortium
 New York Area Theological Library Association
 Nylink
 Ohio Public Library Information Network
 OhioLINK
 Ontario Council of University Libraries
 Orbis Cascade Alliance
 Pacific Manuscripts Bureau
 Research Libraries Group
 Rigler-Deutsch Index
 SAILS
 SELMS
 SearchOhio
 South Central Library System
 South East Academic Libraries System
 Southern Ontario Library Service
 System Wide Automated Network (SWAN)
 Tampa Bay Library Consortium
 TexShare
 The Library Consortium (TLC)
 TRAILS
 UAA/APU Consortium Library
 Utah Academic Library Consortium
 Vermont Organization of Koha Automated Libraries
 Washington Research Library Consortium

References